The Journal of Financial Studies is a quarterly peer-reviewed academic journal that was established in 1993 as the official publication of the Taiwan Finance Association. it covers all aspects of financial research. The journal is included in the Taiwan Social Science Citation Index of the National Science Council and EconLit.

Aims and scope
The focus of this journal is undergraduate and graduate level.  Coverage includes current research in behavioral finance, corporate governance, derivatives, financial management, real estate finance and others.

References

External links 
 
 Taiwan Finance Association

1993 establishments in Taiwan
Finance journals
Publications established in 1993
Quarterly journals
English-language journals
Academic journals published by learned and professional societies